Sara Jane "Sally"  Rowley (October 20, 1931 – May 14, 2020) was an American jewelry-maker and civil rights activist.

Early life and education
Rowley was born in Trenton, New Jersey, the daughter of Emos Rowley and Sara Rowley. She graduated from Stephens College in Missouri. At Stephens, she learned to fly small planes and worked as a flight attendant for American Airlines after graduation.

Activism 
Rowley worked as a secretary in New York in the 1950s and early 1960s. In 1959, she was aboard a plane hijacked by Cuban gunmen. She joined the Freedom Riders, who rode interstate buses into the segregated Southern United States to challenge the non-enforcement of the Supreme Court's ruling that segregated public buses were unconstitutional. She was arrested with other Freedom Riders by Jackson County police in July 1961. After serving time in Mississippi State Penitentiary she returned to New York, but later lived in Mexico, Guatemala, Hawaii, California, and New Mexico, making and selling her jewelry.

Personal life and death
Rowley's partner was artist Felix Pasilis; they never formally married, but lived and worked together from the 1960s until his death in 2018. They had children, Sofie and Oliver, and raised his daughter, Beatrice. 

She died from COVID-19 in May 2020, at age 88, during the COVID-19 pandemic in Arizona, after it swept through her Tucson, Arizona, nursing home. Her granddaughter, Anika Pasilis, wrote an op-ed essay about attending Rowley's deathbed through a window at the nursing home.

References

External links 
 Mississippi State Sovereignty Commission, mug shot photograph of Sally Rowley (1961), in the Mississippi Department of Archives and History.

1931 births
2020 deaths
Freedom Riders
People from Trenton, New Jersey
Activists from New Jersey
Stephens College alumni
Deaths from the COVID-19 pandemic in Arizona
Women civil rights activists